peco is the unit of measurement of the dielectric properties of concrete and other hydrating materials.

The dielectric constant of concrete is about 4.5, but changes with time, as concrete hydrates, and with changes in formulation and/or ingredients.

The unit of peco is derived from the two elements of the dielectric constant (which is a ratio), permittivity and conductivity. peco was coined by Hydronix, Ltd. to represent a unit of output from their TitanCSM device which measures the dielectric properties of concrete as it hardens 

Concrete